

Future membership 
Uzbekistan is applying for a membership in the following international organizations:

World Trade Organization (WTO) - applied on 8 December 1994

Current membership 
Uzbekistan is a member of the following international organizations and partnerships:

 Asia Cooperation Dialogue (ACD) - from 2006
 Central Asia Regional Economic Cooperation Program (CAREC)
 Commonwealth of Independent States (CIS) - from 4 January 1992
 Conference on Interaction & Confidence Measures Building in Asia (CICA)
 Economic Cooperation Organization (ECO)
 Euro-Atlantic Partnership Council (EAPC)
 International Organization of Turkic Culture (TÜRKSOY)
 Organization for Security and Cooperation in Europe (OSCE)
 Organisation of Islamic Cooperation (OIC)
 Organization of Turkic States (OTS)
 Partnership for Peace (PfP) - from 13 July 1994
 Prague Process
 Shanghai Cooperation Organisation (SCO)
 The World Road Association (PIARC)
 United Nations (UN) - from 2 March 1992
 World Bank (WB)

Uzbekistan is also a member or a partner of the following UN institutions and specialized agencies:

Comprehensive Nuclear-Test-Ban Treaty Organization Preparatory Commission (CTBTO) - from 2 October 1996
Food and Agriculture Organization of the United Nations (FAO)
Global Alliance of National Human Rights Institutions (GANHRI)
International Atomic Energy Agency (IAEA) - from 1994
International Civil Aviation Organization (ICAO)
International Fund for Agricultural Development (IFAD) - from 19 February 2011
International Labour Organization (ILO)
International Organization for Migration (IOM)
International Telecommunication Union (ITU)
Joint United Nations Programme on HIV/AIDS (UNAIDS)
Organisation for the Prohibition of Chemical Weapons (OPCW) - signature 24 November 1995, ratification 23 July 1996, entry into force 29 April 1997
United Nations Children's Fund (UNICEF)
United Nations Development Programme (UNDP)
United Nations Economic and Social Commission for Asia and the Pacific (ESCAP)
United Nations Economic Commission for Europe (UNECE) - from 30 July 1993
United Nations Educational, Scientific and Cultural Organization (UNESCO)
United Nations High Commissioner for Refugees (UNHCR)
United Nations Human Rights Council (HRC)
United Nations Industrial Development Organization (UNIDO)
United Nations Special Programme for the Economies of Central Asia (SPECA) 
Universal Postal Union (UPU)
World Bank Group (WBG)
World Health Organization (WHO)
World Intellectual Property Organization (WIPO)
World Meteorological Organization (WMO)
 World Tourism Organization (UNWTO)

Uzbekistan is a member of the following Bretton Woods institutions:

International Monetary Fund (IMF)
International Bank for Reconstruction and Development (IBRD) - from 21 September 1992
International Centre for Settlement of Investment Disputes (ICSID) - from 25 August 1995
International Development Association (IDA) - from 24 September 1992
International Finance Corporation (IFC) - from 30 September 1993
Multilateral Investment Guarantee Agency (MIGA) - from 4 November 1993

Uzbekistan is a member of the following regional development banks:

Asian Development Bank (ADB)
Asian Infrastructure Investment Bank (AIIB) - from 30 November 2016
European Bank for Reconstruction and Development (EBRD) - from 30 April 1992
Islamic Development Bank (IsDB)
Uzbekistan is a partner of the following informal group:

 Global South

Former membership 
Uzbekistan was earlier a membership of the following international organizations:

 Central Asian Cooperation Organization (CACO) - from 2002 to 2005 (merged with EURASEC)
 Central Asian Economic Community (CAEC) - from 1998 to 2002 (renamed to CACO)
 Central Asian Economic Union (CAEU) - from 1994 to 1998 (renamed to CAEC)
 Collective Security Treaty Organization (CSTO) - from 2006 to 28 June 2012
 Eurasian Economic Community (EURASEC) - from 7 October 2005 to 16 October 2008
 GUAM Organization for Democracy and Economic Development (GUAM) - from 1997 to 2005

References 

Uzbekistan
Foreign relations of Uzbekistan